Patrick Hepburn, 3rd Earl of Bothwell (1512 – September 1556) was the son of Adam Hepburn, Lord Hailes, who died at the Battle of Flodden the year after Patrick's birth.

Hepburn was known as the Fair Earl. He owed this more to his looks than his character, being described as "fair and white" while a young boy.

He was imprisoned in 1529 for two years for harbouring robbers. Once released he decided to exact revenge by beginning a treasonable correspondence with England. He then spent much of the next years in England, and after James V died following the Battle of Solway Moss, Hepburn signed a pact with Henry VIII promising to serve him and aid the commitment of the then infant Mary, Queen of Scots, into Henry's custody.

Despite having sworn loyalty to Henry VIII, Hepburn was awarded an annual pension of £1,000 from Mary of Guise (Mary, Queen of Scots' mother) in return for his patriotic fidelity.  It was said that Hepburn believed there was the possibility of marrying into royalty and that was his reason for divorcing his wife. However, the prospects for royal marriage were thin and despite Henry VIII engaging in another bloody invasion of Scotland, Hepburn resumed correspondence with the English Court. In the intervening years, Hepburn played a role in the death of George Wishart.

In 1548, Hepburn renounced his loyalty to the Scottish crown, and became a pensioner of England, earning £3,000 annually.  He went into England in July 1549, staying two nights at Naworth Castle. However, in 1554 he returned to Scotland after his formal pardon by Mary of Guise. He died at Dumfries.

The Earl of Bothwell married in 1534, Agnes (d. 1572), daughter of Henry Sinclair, 4th Lord Sinclair (who also fell at Flodden). They were divorced before 16 October 1543, whereafter she was styled Lady Morham until her death. They had three children:
James Hepburn, 4th Earl of Bothwell, his son and heir, who eventually became the third and last husband of Mary, Queen of Scots.
 Jean (Janet) Hepburn (d. before 27 July 1599) whose first husband was John Sinclair, Master of Caithness (d.1578, v.p.), with issue; her second husband was John Stewart, Commendator of Coldingham, by whom she had Francis Stewart, 5th Earl of Bothwell; her third husband the notorious Archibald Douglas, Parson of Douglas, a Senator of the College of Justice, and brother of William Douglas of Whittinghame.

References

The Royal Families of England Scotland and Wales, with their descendants, etc., by John and John Bernard Burke, London, 1848, volume 1, pedigree CXXXIX.
The Scots Peerage, by Sir James Balfour Paul, Edinburgh, 1905, vol. 1, pp. 157–160.

Hepburn, Patrick, 3rd Earl of Bothwell
Hepburn, Patrick, 3rd Earl of Bothwell
Earls of Bothwell
Hepburn, Patrick, 3rd Earl of Bothwell
Hepburn, Patrick, 3rd Earl of Bothwell
16th-century Scottish military personnel